Gonzalo Barrios Bustillos (10 January 1902 – 30 May 1993), was a Venezuelan politician. He was a founding member of the political party Acción Democrática (AD) and Minister of Foreign Affairs during the Trienio Adeco (1945-48). Later he signed the Puntofijo Pact on behalf of AD and served as Minister of Interior and Justice under Raúl Leoni (1964–1966).

He was AD's presidential candidate in the 1968 Venezuelan presidential election, and later President of the Venezuelan Senate from 1974 to 1979. He was elected Secretary General of AD in 1966.

See also
List of Ministers of Foreign Affairs of Venezuela

References

External links
 Biography at Venezuelatuya.com

People from Acarigua
Members of the Senate of Venezuela
Central University of Venezuela alumni
Venezuelan Ministers of Foreign Affairs
Venezuelan Ministers of Interior
Presidents of the Senate of Venezuela
1902 births
1993 deaths
Democratic Action (Venezuela) politicians
20th-century Venezuelan lawyers
Secretariat of the Presidency ministers of Venezuela